The rodéo was a technique of rioting which became popular in France beginning in 1981, often associated with youth of North African descent, and the Lyon suburb of Minguettes. 

Over the summer of 1981, 250 cars were stolen and burned in government housing projects of Marseilles, Lyon, Roubaix, Nancy, and Paris. These riots consisted of stealing cars, driving them in tight circles, and ultimately burning them. Some reports indicate the cars were stolen from more prosperous areas, and taken to depressed neighborhoods to be burned in order to lure police to those areas for street battles.

References

1981 in France
Riots and civil disorder in France
History of Marseille
20th century in Lyon
Nancy, France
20th century in Paris
1981 riots